O Melhor de Rui Veloso – 20 anos depois (The Best of Rui Veloso – 20 Years Later) is a greatest hits album by Rui Veloso. The album was released in 2000.

Track listing

References

External links
O Melhor de Rui Veloso - 20 anos depois at Rate Your Music
O Melhor de Rui Veloso - 20 anos depois at moo.pt 

2000 compilation albums
Rui Veloso albums